Yalnichevskaya is a rural locality (a village) in Nizhne-Vazhskoye Rural Settlement, Verkhovazhsky District, Vologda Oblast, Russia. The population was 10 as of 2002.

Geography 
Yalnichevskaya is located 18 km east of Verkhovazhye (the district's administrative centre) by road. Pogost Ilyinsky is the nearest rural locality.

References 

Rural localities in Verkhovazhsky District